Risk reduction may refer to:

 Absolute risk reduction or Relative risk reduction, statistical descriptors of an intervention.
 Risk management
 Disaster Risk Reduction
 Safety Integrity Level
 Hedge (finance)
 Diversification (finance)